Judy Yung (1946 – December 14, 2020) was professor emerita in American Studies at the University of California, Santa Cruz. She specialized in oral history, women's history, and Asian American history. She died on December 14, 2020 in San Francisco, where she had returned in retirement.

Life
Judy Yung was the fifth daughter of six children born to immigrant parents from China.  She grew up in San Francisco Chinatown, where her father worked as a janitor and her mother as a seamstress to support the family.  Yung was able to acquire a bilingual education by attending both public school and Chinese language school for ten years.  She received her Ph.D. in Ethnic Studies from the University of California, Berkeley. She also held an M.A. in Library Science from the University of California, Berkeley, and a B.A. in English Literature and Chinese from San Francisco State University.

Prior to entering academia, Yung worked as librarian for the Chinatown branch of the San Francisco Public Library and the Asian branch of the Oakland Public Library, pioneering the development of Asian language materials and Asian American interest collections in the public library to better serve the Asian American community.  She also spent four years working as associate editor of the East West newspaper.

In 1975, inspired by the discovery of Chinese poetry on the walls of the Angel Island detention barracks, Yung embarked on a research project with Him Mark Lai and Genny Lim to translate the poems and interview former Chinese detainees about their immigration experiences.  They self-published Island: Poetry and History of Chinese Immigrants on Angel Island, 1910-1940 in 1980, and a second expanded edition of the book was published by the University of Washington Press in 2014.

From 1981 to 1983, with a federal grant from the Women’s Educational Equity Program, Yung directed the Chinese Women of America Research Project, resulting in the first traveling exhibit on the history of Chinese American women and the book, Chinese Women of America: A Pictorial History.  She then returned to graduate school to hone her research skills as a historian.

Upon receiving her Ph.D. in Ethnic Studies, Yung was hired to establish an Asian American Studies program at the University of California, Santa Cruz, where she taught courses in Asian American studies, women's history, oral history, and mixed race until she retired in 2004.  She has since devoted her time to writing more books about Chinese American history and serving as a historical consultant with a number of community organizations and film projects.

In 2002, while working on Chinese American Voices, Judy Yung met Eddie Fung, a POW during World War II.  They got married a year later and made Santa Cruz their home.  After her husband died in 2018, Yung moved back to her hometown San Francisco.

She died on December 14, 2020, of complications from a fall at her home. She was 74 years old.

Awards
 2015, National Women’s History Month Honoree
 2015, Immigrant Heritage Award in Education, Angel Island Immigration Station Foundation
 2011, Caughey Western History Association Prize (for Angel Island)
 2007, Annie Soo Spirit Award, Chinese Historical Society of America
 2006, Lifetime Achievement Award, Association for Asian American Studies
 2003, Excellence Through Diversity Award, University of California, Santa Cruz
 2001, Presidential Recognition Award, Chinese American Librarians Association
 1999, Excellence in Teaching Award, University of California, Santa Cruz
 1997, Jeanne Farr McDonnell Book Award (for Unbound Feet), Women’s Heritage Museum
 1996, Robert G. Athearn Book Award (for Unbound Feet), Western History Association
 1996, National Book Award in History (for Unbound Feet), Association for Asian American Studies
 1996, Distinguished Award for Culture, Chinese Culture Foundation of San Francisco
 1987, Outstanding Asian Women of the Year, Asian Women’s Resource Center, San Francisco
 1982, American Book Award (for Island: Poetry and History of Chinese Immigrants on Angel Island, 1910-1940), Before Columbus Foundation
 1980, Outstanding Citizen Award, Oakland Museum

Works

References

External links
 "Bound Feet", Becoming American, the Chinese Experience, PBS

1946 births
2020 deaths
American writers of Chinese descent
University of California, Santa Cruz faculty
University of California, Berkeley School of Information alumni
San Francisco State University alumni
American women sociologists
American sociologists
American librarians
American women librarians
American Book Award winners
Writers from San Francisco
20th-century American non-fiction writers
20th-century American women writers
21st-century American non-fiction writers
21st-century American women writers
American women non-fiction writers
UC Berkeley College of Letters and Science alumni